Thieves is a 1996 French drama film directed by André Téchiné, starring Daniel Auteuil, Catherine Deneuve and Laurence Côte.  The plot follows a cynical police officer, who comes from a family of thieves, and a lonely philosophy professor, both romantically involved with a self-destructive petty criminal. With a puzzling structure, the story is told through a series of flashbacks presented from four different perspectives.

Plot 
Justin, a boy who is living in a small town in the Rhône-Alpes region, is awaken in the middle of the night. His mother, Mireille is crying and his widower grandfather, Victor, tells the boy that his father, Ivan, is dead. The next day, Alex, Justin's uncle and Ivan's little brother, arrives for the funeral accompanied by a woman, Juliette. Justin notice the tension between people. He takes his father's gun and hides it. The story flashes backward and forward to explain what led up to Ivan's death.

Alex, who has rebelled against his family by becoming a cop, works in the deprived La Duchere district of Lyon. He begins with his encounter, a year before Ivan's death, when he first meets Juliette, who is brought to his office when she was arrested for shoplifting. He lets her off. He sees her again one day when he visits the sleazy nightclub run by his big brother, Ivan. Ivan is a crime boss and runs a popular club with a drag revue, funding his business through a stolen-auto ring headed up by Jimmy, who is Juliette's brother. The encounter between the siblings on opposite sides of the law is tense, they barely get along. Ivan is happy to show Alex that he is doing much better than him on the wrong side of the law. After their second encounter Alex and Juliette start a tortured affair beginning to meet regularly for sex. He is not in love with her, and their relationship is complicated by the girl's emotional and sexual involvement with Marie, a professor of philosophy. Alex spies on Marie. Ivan hears about Juliette's relationship with Alex and threatens her. Ivan and his gang, including Juliette, plan the theft of cars in a railway deposit.

The heist at the railway marshaling yard goes disastrously wrong when Ivan is shot dead. Juliette, who had been coerced into participating, against Jimmy's wishes, is distraught by Ivan's death. Emotional imbalance and self-destructive, Juliette tries to commit suicide twice, first while staying with her brother and later while visiting Marie, after Ivan's death. Marie has her interned in a psychiatric hospital to recuperate. Alex asks Marie for the address of Juliette's clinic, but she has disappeared. In search of Juliette, Marie visits her housing estate apartment. After Ivan's cremation, Alex makes an effort to connect with his nephew without much success. On a local fair, Justin threatens Alex with a gun. Justin learns the truth about his father's death from his grandfather Victor.

Marie visits Alex, who tells her Juliette was involved in the heist and that he is trying to find her. Alex and Marie develop an uneasy friendship as they bid, from a distance, to protect Juliette. Later Alex visits Marie and finds she has become a recluse, writing a book about Juliette. He tells her Juliette is safe because the police are looking for a boy. Later Alex hears that Marie has committed suicide as he receives her manuscript and the tapes of Juliette's voice in the post. Alex goes to see Juliette in Marseilles, but leaves her alone when he sees she is well from a distance. She has built a new life for herself and works in a bookshop. Justin has taken after his father and grandfather and does not like his uncle. By contrast, Justin gets along very well with Jimmy. Jimmy decides to marry Ivan's widow, Mireille.

Cast
 Daniel Auteuil as Alex
 Catherine Deneuve as Marie Leblanc
 Laurence Côte as Juliette Fontana
 Benoît Magimel as Jimmy Fontana
 Didier Bezace as Ivan
 Julien Rivière as Justin
 Ivan Desny as Victor
 Fabienne Babe as Mireille
 Régis Betoule as Régis
 Pierre Perez as Fred
 Naguime Bendidi as Nabil

Reception 
The film premiered in May 1996 at the 49th Cannes Film Festival. It was released in France on 21 August 1996  and in the United States on 25 December that same year.
 
Thieves received widespread praise from film critics. It is generally considered, with My Favorite Season and Wild Reeds, among Téchiné's best films.  Review aggregate Rotten Tomatoes  reports that 82% of 11 critics have given the film a positive review, holding an average score of 7/10.

On line film critic James Berardinelli called the film  "strong and keenly-insightful ". Roger Ebert from the Chicago Sun-Times wrote that "Téchiné involves us in a subtle, gradual process of discovery; each piece changes the relationship of the others. He is so wise about these criminals, he makes the bad guys in most American films look like cartoon characters."

In USA Today Mike Clark  commented that in Thieves “Deneuve gives one of her best performances ever, though she's not exactly the movie's focus. Of the many pleasures here, one is trying to guess just who the dramatic focal point is". Janet Maslin in the New York Times reported that in the film "Téchiné explores the intricate connections among these characters with a somber, penetrating wisdom that is the film's main reward." Jonathan Rosenbaum from Chicago Reader called the film "a Masterpiece"

The film received five nomination to the Cesar Awards, including the categories of Best Film, Best Director, Best Actress (Catherine Deneuve), Best Young Actor (Benoît Magimel) and Best Young Actress (Laurence Côte). It won only in the last category. In addition, Benoît Magimel received the Prix Michel Simon as Best Actor for his performance in Thieves.

Production
Thieves was directed by André Téchiné in the style of film noir. Its fragmented structure has been compared to a William Faulkner's novel, particularly to The Sound and the Fury (1929).  The narrative — consisting of a prologue, five sections, and an epilogue — leaps around in time and switches between the viewpoints of Justin, Alex, Marie, and Juliette. The Sound and the Fury unfolds over four days, likewise, switching narrative perspectives. Both The Sound and the Fury and Thieves also have a central female character who is loved obsessively by two of the narrators: Faulkner's novel has Caddie, who is loved by her brothers Benjy and Quentin, and Téchiné's film has Juliette, who is the love interest of both Alex and Marie.  The divided time structure emphasize the interlapping relationships between the characters.

Music
The original score for the film was written by Alain Sarde, regular composer in Téchiné's films. The sound track includes an eclectic mix of artist and styles like : Cheb Mami, Liza Minnelli, The Archies  and Mozart. 
 Douha Alia Cheb Mami
 Baadini Rachid Taha
 Sous le soleil de Bodega Les Négresses Vertes
 Sugar Sugar The Archies
 The Magic Flute Wolfgang Amadeus Mozart
 Tonite Les Rita Mitsouko
 La Valse Petite La Tordue

Home media 
The film was released on DVD on 4 March 2011 in the United States by Sony Pictures as a DVD-R manufactured on demand. The film is in French with incorporated English subtitles. Les Voleurs  is also available in Region 2 DVD.

References

Further reading
 Marshall, Bill. André Téchiné, Manchester University Press, 2007,

External links
 
 
 

1996 drama films
1996 films
1990s French-language films
Films directed by André Téchiné
Films scored by Philippe Sarde
French crime films
French drama films
French LGBT-related films
Lesbian-related films
Films set in Lyon
1990s French films